The 18th Annual Japan Record Awards took place at the Imperial Garden Theater in Chiyoda, Tokyo, on December 31, 1976, starting at 7:00PM JST. The primary ceremonies were televised in Japan on TBS.

Winners

Japan Record Award
Harumi Miyako – "Kita no Yadokara"
Lyricist: Yū Aku
Composer: Asei Kobayashi
Arranger: Jiro Takemura
 Record Company: Nippon Columbia

Best Vocalist
Aki Yashiro for "Mou Ichido Aitai"

Best New Artist
Yasuko Naito for "Omoide Boroboro"

Singing Award
Naoko Ken for "Abayo"
Goro Noguchi for "Shinyouju"
Awarded again after last year, 2nd vocalist award.
Hideki Saijo – "Wakaki Shishi Tachi"
Awarded again after last year, 3rd vocalist award.

General Public Award
Hiromi Go for "Anata ga Itakara Boku ga Ita" and other songs.

New Artist Award
Yoshimi Ashikawa for "Yuki Go Mori"
Hiroshi Kadokawa for "Uso Demo Ii No"
Kenji Niinuma for "Yome Ni Konai Ka"
Pink Lady for "Pepper Keibu"

Composer Award
Ryudo Uzaki for "Omoide Boroboro"
Singer: Yasuko Naitō

Arranger Award
Mitsuo Hagita for "Melancholy"
Singer: Michiyo Azusa

Lyricist Award
Yoko Aki for "Yokosuka Story"
Singer: Momoe Yamaguchi

Special Award
Hibari Misora
Dark Ducks

Nominations

Best 10 JRA Nominations

New Artist

General Public Award

Lyricist Award

Composer Award

Arranger Award

Planning Award

Special Award

External links 
 Complete list of all winners

Japan Record Awards
Japan Record Awards
Japan Record Awards
Japan Record Awards
1976